Long Seridan is a Kelabit settlement in the Miri division of Sarawak, Malaysia.

Long Seridan Airport has a STOL runway, originally built by Gurkha engineers in 1963. There are several homestays where tourists can stay and enjoy the local jungle trekking, fishing and visiting Penan settlements.

Neighbouring settlements include:

References

Populated places in Sarawak